Hans Schmid may refer to:

 Hans Schmid (ice hockey) (1898–?), German ice hockey player
 Hans Schmid (ski jumper) (born 1948), Swiss Olympic ski jumper
 Hans Heinrich Schmid (1937–2014), Swiss Protestant Reformed theologian
 Hans Peter Schmid, climatologist